Łysica  is the highest mountain in the Świętokrzyskie Mountains of Poland. It is located in the Świętokrzyski National Park and there is an abbey below it, on a site that might have been a pagan temple before the times of baptism of Poland.

Łysica, which is also called Gora Swietej Katarzyny (St. Catherine's Mountain) lies in western part of the Lysogory range, near the village of Swieta Katarzyna. It belongs to the so-called Crown of Polish Mountains (“Korona Gor Polskich”), as it is the highest mountain of Holy Cross Mountains. Łysica has two peaks -  western (613 m) and Eastern (Agatha's rock, pol. Skała Agaty) - 614 m)). 

The mountain is made of quartzite and slate, its northern and southern slopes are marked by the stone run. Furthermore, on the southern slope, at the height of 590 meters, there is a small bog. Most of Łysica is covered by a forest, near the peak there are fir trees, below which are beeches. Łysica is inhabited by birds of prey, such as the lesser spotted eagle, the Eurasian sparrowhawk, and the Eurasian hobby.

See also

 Łysa Góra

Mountains of Poland
Landforms of Świętokrzyskie Voivodeship